This is the list of episodes for The Tonight Show Starring Jimmy Fallon in 2020.
All episodes from March 23–June 26 were filmed at Fallon's home due to the COVID-19 pandemic.

2020

January

February

March

April

May

June

July

August

September

October

November

December

References

External links
 
 Lineups at Interbridge 
 NBCU Media Village – Listings: May 22 – 29 2020
 NBCU Media Village – Listings: July 15 – 22 2020

Episodes 2020
Lists of American non-fiction television series episodes
Lists of variety television series episodes